The 8th Nongshim Cup began on 12 September 2006 and concluded on 9 February 2007, with Lee Chang-ho leading Team Korea to their seventh title.

Teams

Results

First round

Second round

Final round

References

2007 in go
Nongshim Cup